Germán Carlos Leguía Dragó, also known as Cocoliche, (born January 2, 1954 in Lima) is a retired professional football striker and midfielder from Peru.

He competed for the Peru national football team at the 1978 and 1982 FIFA World Cup, and obtained a total number of 31 caps for his native country, scoring three goals, in the years 1978 to 1983.

Playing career

Club
Leguía began playing football in his native Peru with Club Universitario de Deportes and moved to Europe in 1983. He joined Segunda División side Elche CF, helping the club gain promotion to La Liga in his first season, but the club were relegated at the end of the 1984–85 season. Next, Leguía moved to Germany to play for 1. FC Köln, however he didn't settle due to problems with his registration and never appeared in an official match for the club. He then had a spell at Belgian side Beveren for whom he only played three cup matches before disappearing back to Germany and spent half a season at Portuguese side Farense.

In 1987, he transferred from Germany to Ecuador where he played for Macará until 1989.

Leguía played club football until 1991, when his Universitario de Deportes coach benched him before the final of the 1990 Peruvian championship, and he subsequently decided to retire.

International
Leguía played for Peru at the 1979 and 1983 Copa América.

Managerial career
After he retired from playing, became a football coach. He managed former club Universitario during 2009.

References

External links
 
 

1954 births
Living people
Footballers from Lima
Association football midfielders
Peruvian footballers
Peru international footballers
1978 FIFA World Cup players
1982 FIFA World Cup players
1979 Copa América players
1983 Copa América players
Association football forwards
Deportivo Municipal footballers
Club Universitario de Deportes footballers
Elche CF players
1. FC Köln players
K.S.K. Beveren players
S.C. Farense players
C.S.D. Macará footballers
S.D. Aucas footballers
Sport Boys footballers
Peruvian expatriate footballers
Expatriate footballers in Spain
Expatriate footballers in Belgium
Expatriate footballers in Portugal
Expatriate footballers in Ecuador
Peruvian Primera División players
La Liga players